Amedalin (UK-3540-1) is an antidepressant which was synthesized in the early 1970s, but was never marketed. It is a selective norepinephrine reuptake inhibitor, with no significant effects on the reuptake of serotonin and dopamine, and no antihistamine or anticholinergic properties.

See also 
 Daledalin

References 

Abandoned drugs
Amines
Antidepressants
Indolines
Gamma-lactams
Norepinephrine reuptake inhibitors
Oxindoles